Haiweeite is a mineral of uranium and has the chemical formula: Ca[(UO2)2Si5O12(OH)2]·3(H2O). It is a secondary mineral of uranium, a product of oxidation. It has a greenish yellow color.  It has a Mohs hardness of about 3.5 and is fluorescent under UV light.

It was named after the Haiwee Reservoir, Inyo County, California, US, where it was first found.

References

Mindat.org
Handbook of Mineralogy
Webmineral data

Uranium(VI) minerals
Nesosilicates